Hotel Transylvania is a 2012 American computer-animated monster comedy film produced by Columbia Pictures and Sony Pictures Animation. The first installment in the Hotel Transylvania franchise, it was directed by Genndy Tartakovsky (in his theatrical feature directorial debut) from a screenplay by Peter Baynham and Robert Smigel and a story by Todd Durham, Dan Hageman and Kevin Hageman. The film stars the voices of Adam Sandler, Andy Samberg, Selena Gomez, Kevin James, Fran Drescher, Steve Buscemi, Molly Shannon, David Spade and CeeLo Green.

The film tells the story of Count Dracula, the owner of the titular Hotel Transylvania where the world's monsters can take a rest from human civilization. Dracula invites some of the most famous monsters to celebrate the 118th birthday of his beloved daughter Mavis. When the "human-free hotel" is unexpectedly visited by an ordinary  traveler named Jonathan, Drac must do everything in his power to prevent Mavis from falling in love with him before the hotel's guests learn a human is in the castle, which may jeopardize the hotel's future and his career.

Hotel Transylvania was released on September 28, 2012 by Sony Pictures Releasing. Despite receiving mixed reviews from critics, the film was positively welcomed from audiences and it earned a total of $358 million worldwide at the box office against a budget of $85 million and was nominated for a Golden Globe Award for Best Animated Feature Film. The financial success of Hotel Transylvania launched a multimedia franchise and a series of three sequels, starting with Hotel Transylvania 2 (2015).

Plot
In 1895, after his wife Martha was killed by an angry human mob, Count Dracula commissions and builds a massive monsters-only hotel in Transylvania, in which he raises his daughter, Mavis. The hotel also serves as a safe haven and a getaway for the world's monsters from fear of human persecution. Famous monsters such as Frankenstein and his wife Eunice, Wayne and Wanda Werewolf and their massive immediate family, Griffin the Invisible Man, and Murray the Mummy often come to stay at the hotel.

In the present-day (2012), on Mavis' 118th birthday, Dracula allows his daughter to leave the castle to explore the human world, but he sets up an elaborate plan using his zombie bellhops disguised as humans to make them seem intimidating, and frighten her home. The plan works, but the zombies inadvertently lead a  human, Jonathan "Johnny" Loughran back to the hotel. Drac frantically disguises him as a Frankensteinesque monster and passes him off as Frank's cousin "Johnnystein". Jonathan soon encounters Mavis and the two "Zing". Unable to get Johnny out of the hotel without notice, Drac quickly improvises that Johnny is a party planner, brought in to bring a fresher approach to his own traditional and boring parties. Johnny quickly becomes a hit to the other monsters, but this worries Drac, who is both jealous of Johnny's popularity and afraid that his friends will never return to the hotel if they find out about the lie. Drac orders Johnny to leave, but he is brought back by Mavis, who is unaware of Johnny's real species and feud with her father. After being shown the beauty of a sunrise by Johnny, Mavis is inspired to give humans another chance.

Meanwhile, the hotel chef Quasimodo, with the help of his pet rat Esmeralda, learns that Johnny is a human and kidnaps him to cook him. Drac intervenes and magically freezes Quasimodo to keep him from telling anyone that Johnny is human. Drac leads Johnny to his quarters and shows him a painting of Martha, allowing Johnny to realize why Drac built the hotel and became overprotective of Mavis. Johnny then agrees to leave for good, but Drac, noticing that Mavis and Johnny's feelings for each other are real, persuades him to stay for the time being to avoid ruining Mavis's birthday. Drac and Johnny begin to bond and have fun together.

The party is a great success the next night, and Mavis looks forward to opening a gift from Martha. However, when Johnny and Mavis share their first kiss, Drac overreacts, and in his outburst, inadvertently confesses to deceiving Mavis with the town. A still-frozen Quasimodo bursts in and Mr. Fly reveals from his frozen speech that Johnny is a human disguised by Drac. The guests are shocked and outraged by the deceit at play, but Mavis is undeterred and wants to be with Johnny. Johnny feigns uninterest in Mavis and rejects her out of respect for her father and leaves the hotel.

A heartbroken Mavis flies onto the roof with her mother's gift, and Drac follows her in hopes of comforting her. He learns the present is a book about how Drac and Martha "Zinged" and fell in love. Drac realizes he no longer knows humankind's true tolerance of monsters. After apologizing to the patrons, Drac persuades Frank, Wayne, Griffin, and Murray to head out into the human world to help him find Johnny, and with the scent-tracking ability of Wayne's daughter, Winnie, they learn that he is about to catch a flight back to the United States.

The four head to the airport, but are held up in a town celebrating a Monster Festival along the way.  Frankenstein attempts to scare away the assembled crowd of humans with a loud roar but instead receives wild applause and adoration. He then gets the humans to agree to help, and a team of men dressed as vampires provides Drac shelter from the sunlight while he rushes to the airport. Drac arrives to see Johnny's plane taking off, and he gives chase in bat form, burning in the sunlight. After getting Johnny's attention, Drac makes his way to the windshield of the plane and uses his mind-controlling power on the pilot to help him apologize, stating that Mavis has grown up and can make her own decisions. Johnny accepts his apology, and Drac manipulates the pilot to return to the Transylvanian airport.

Drac returns Johnny to Mavis, announcing that he approves of Johnny. Johnny confesses to Mavis that their "Zing" was mutual and the two kiss. The monsters finish celebrating Mavis' party, impressing the hotel guests.

Voice cast

The heads of the Hydra named Mr. Hydraberg are voiced by Jim Wise, Paul Brittain, Jonny Solomon, Craig Kellman, and Brian McCann.

Production

Hotel Transylvania was originally created and developed by comedy writer Todd Durham, which he based on his book of the same name; after creating the bible for a franchise of several films, television series, holiday TV specials, video games, books, merchandising, hotel chain, and theme parks, he took the package unsolicited to Columbia Pictures and set it up at Sony Pictures Animation where he became the first of several screenwriters on the project.

The development process ultimately went through six directors; in 2006, Anthony Stacchi and David Feiss became the first directors set to helm the film.  They were replaced by Jill Culton in 2008, who was followed by Chris Jenkins, with Todd Wilderman in 2010.  In February 2011, Genndy Tartakovsky, creator of Dexter's Laboratory, Samurai Jack, and Star Wars: Clone Wars, took over as the sixth scheduled director, and made his feature directorial debut with the film.  He reimagined the film to follow the energy, organic nature, and exaggeration of 2D animation, particularly as seen in the work of director Tex Avery.  "I took all the aesthetics I like from 2-D and applied them here," Tartakovsky said. "I don't want to do animation to mimic reality. I want to push reality." "I wanted to have an imprint so you'd go, 'Well, only Genndy can make this.' It's hard, especially with CG, but I feel there's a lot of moments that feel that they're very me, so hopefully it'll feel different enough that it has a signature to it."

In November 2011, Miley Cyrus was announced to voice Mavis, Dracula's teenaged daughter, but in February 2012, she was removed from the film. In August 2019, Cyrus admitted it was because of buying then-partner Liam Hemsworth a birthday cake in the shape of a penis and licking it. It was later announced that Selena Gomez would replace Cyrus. According to Tartakovsky his favorite Dracula was Bela Lugosi, especially in the context of Abbott and Costello. As a kid he really did not like horror movies, so he never really watched them. So he got introduced to all those characters through comedy, and so it was Abbott and Costello Meet Frankenstein and Meet the Mummy, etc. As Tartakovsky said [in relation to making Hotel Transylvania]: "I don't want to scare anybody. I just want to make them laugh with these iconic characters."

Soundtrack
 "Where Did the Time Go Girl (Party Version)" Written by Robert Smigel, Adam Sandler, and Dennis White. Produced by Static Revenger.
 "Daddy's Girl" Written by Adam Sandler and Robert Smigel. Performed by Adam Sandler.
 "Call Me Mavy" Performed by Traci L.
 "Problem (The Monster Remix)" Written by Henry Walter, Lukasz Gottwald, Becky G (as Becky Gomez) & will.i.am (as William Adams). Performed by Becky G featuring will.i.am.
 "Sexy and I Know It", performed by LMFAO
 "The Zing" Written by Adam Sandler, Robert Smigel, and Dennis White. Produced by Static Revenger. Performed by Adam Sandler, Andy Samberg, CeeLo Green, Kevin James, and Selena Gomez.
 "Helpless", written and performed by Peter Tvrznik
 "Sweet 118", written by Andy Samberg, Stuart Hart and Trevor Simpson. Performed by Andy Samberg.
 "Hush Little Baby", performed by Adam Sandler.
 "Monster Mash", performed by Bobby Pickett.

Release

Theatrical
Hotel Transylvania premiered on September 8, 2012, at the Toronto International Film Festival. The film received a wide release on September 28, 2012. On October 26, 2012, Regal Entertainment Group Cinemas began exclusively playing the traditionally animated short film Goodnight Mr. Foot before the film. Based on Hotel Transylvania, the short was directed and animated by Genndy Tartakovsky.

Home media
Hotel Transylvania was released on Blu-ray (2D and 3D) and DVD on January 29, 2013. It was accompanied by the short animated film, Goodnight Mr. Foot.

In April 2021, Sony signed a deal giving Disney access to their legacy content, including the Hotel Transylvania franchise to stream on Disney+ and Hulu and appear on Disney's linear television networks. Disney's access to Sony's titles would come following their availability on Netflix.

Reception

Box office
Hotel Transylvania earned $148.3 million in North America, and $210.1 million in other countries, for a worldwide total of $358.4 million. The officially reported budget for the film was $85 million, although Deadline Hollywood claimed that the film actually cost $104 million. For the film's marketing, Sony spent $52.1 million in the United States, and $31 million in other countries.

Hotel Transylvania topped the box office with $11 million on its first Friday, and $42.5 million domestically and $50.6 million worldwide for its opening weekend, which at the time of its release broke Sweet Home Alabamas record for the largest-grossing September opening, a record which was overtaken by its sequel Hotel Transylvania 2 in 2015, with a weekend gross of $48.5 million. The film also earned the highest-grossing domestic debut for Sony Pictures Animation (also later overtaken by Hotel Transylvania 2). According to Sony's president of worldwide distribution, Rory Bruer, Sony was very satisfied with the film's performance, which was "beyond anyone's imagination, and the holds are ridiculous. It exceeds expectations in every new market it opens in." Hotel Transylvania was theatrically released in China on October 28, 2013, more than a year after the worldwide premiere, and contributed $11,180,000 to the overall gross.

Critical response
Its critical consensus reads, "Hotel Transylvanias buoyant, giddy tone may please children, but it might be a little too loud and thinly-scripted for older audiences." Metacritic (which uses a weighted average) assigned Hotel Transylvania a score of 47 out of 100 based on 32 critics, indicating "mixed or average reviews". Audiences polled by CinemaScore gave the film an average grade of "A−" on an A+ to F scale.

IGN editor Geoff Chapman rated the film 9 out of 10 and wrote "This is a fun film, full of quirky gags and lovable characters. There are a few songs that smack a bit like soundtrack marketing for the kids, and the story is of course fairly predictable, but this movie is about enjoying a fun journey with great characters. It's a romp that kids and families will all enjoy. Hotel Transylvania is definitely somewhere you'll want to check in."

Accolades

Sequels

The sequel, titled Hotel Transylvania 2, was released on September 25, 2015. Its story takes place seven years after the first film, with the hotel now open to human guests, and its owner, Count Dracula, being more preoccupied with the fact that his 5-year-old grandson is not a pure-blood vampire. The original crew and cast returned for the film, except CeeLo Green as the role of Murray, who was replaced by Keegan-Michael Key. New additions include Mel Brooks as Dracula's father, Vlad; Nick Offerman and Megan Mullally as Jonathan's parents, Mike and Linda; and Asher Blinkoff as Mavis and Johnny's half-human/half-vampire son, Dennis.

Hotel Transylvania 2 was followed by Hotel Transylvania 3: Summer Vacation, released on July 13, 2018.

The fourth and final installment in the series is Hotel Transylvania: Transformania, released as an Amazon Prime Video exclusive on January 14, 2022.

See also
 List of films featuring Frankenstein's monster
 Vampire film

References

External links

 
 
 

 
2012 3D films
3D animated films
2012 animated films
2012 computer-animated films
2010s American animated films
2010s children's comedy films
2010s fantasy comedy films
2010s monster movies
American 3D films
American children's animated comedy films
American children's animated fantasy films
American comedy horror films
American computer-animated films
American fantasy comedy films
American monster movies
Films about father–daughter relationships
Dracula films
Films scored by Mark Mothersbaugh
Animated films about families
Films about shapeshifting
Films about vacationing
Films adapted into television shows
Films produced by Michelle Murdocca
Films set in the 1890s
Films set in 1895
Films set in 2012
Films set in hotels
Films set in Transylvania
Films set in Romania
Frankenstein films
Mummy films
Bigfoot films
Films about Yeti
Werewolves in animated film
Columbia Pictures films
Columbia Pictures animated films
Films with screenplays by Peter Baynham
Films with screenplays by Robert Smigel
Sony Pictures Animation films
Films directed by Genndy Tartakovsky
Human-vampire romance in fiction
American crossover films
2012 directorial debut films
2012 comedy films
2012 fantasy films
Films set in castles
Films with screenplays by The Hageman Brothers
2010s English-language films